Cyclophora albiocellaria is a moth of the family Geometridae. It is found in south-eastern Europe and parts of Central-Asia.

The wingspan is 20–25 mm in the first generation and only about 18 mm in the second generation. The apex of the forewing is slightly pointed. The ground colour is pale yellow with an orange tinge. The postmedial line is dissolved to brown dots. The medial area towards postmedial line and towards the inner area shows a strong black brown coloration on all wings. Cell rings are large and round on all wings with a white centre.

The larvae feed on Acer campestre.

Taxonomy
Cyclophora lennigiaria is treated as a subspecies of Cyclophora albiocellaria by some authors.

References 

 Axel Hausmann: The Geometrid moths of Europe, Vol. 2, Sterrhinae. Apollo Books, Stenstrup 2004,

External links 
Lepiforum.de

Cyclophora (moth)
Moths described in 1789
Moths of Europe
Moths of Asia
Taxa named by Jacob Hübner